An-Nu'man ibn Humaydah al-Bariqi (died 600 CE) was a philosopher in Classical Arab.  In addition, he was knight and the leader of the Bariq tribe, located in Bariq of Azd, Yemen and was famous for its glory.

Lineage 
His full name was al-Nu'man b. Humaydah b. al-Harith b. Awf b. Amr b. Sa`d b. Thailbh b. Kinanah al-Bariqi Ibn Bariq Ibn Uday Ibn Haritha Ibn Amr Mazikiee Ibn Aamr bin Haritha Algtarif bin Imru al-Qais Thailb bin Mazen Ibn Al-Azd Ibn Al-Ghoth Ibn Nabit Ibn Malik bin Zaid Ibn Kahlan Ibn Saba'a (Sheba) Ibn Yashjub Ibn Yarab Ibn Qahtan Ibn Hud (Eber).

 Humaydah b. al-Harith, was  his father.
 Humaydah b. al-Nu'man b. Humaydah al-Bariqi, was  his son.

Quotes 
Telling the truth has left me no friends.

References 

600 deaths
6th-century Arabic poets
Banu Bariq
Year of birth unknown
Yemeni poets